Blaise Sonnery (born 21 March 1985 in L'Arbresle, Rhône) is a French former professional road bicycle racer who previously rode for UCI ProTour team .

Major results

2003
 1st  Overall Tour des Pays de Savoie
1st Stage 3
2005
3rd Overall Ronde de l'Isard
2006
3rd Road race, National Under-23 Road Championships
3rd Overall Ronde de l'Isard
1st Stage 5
3rd Overall Tour des Pays de Savoie
2009
8th Tour du Doubs
2012
8th Overall Tour of Japan

References

External links 

1985 births
Living people
People from L'Arbresle
French male cyclists
Sportspeople from Rhône (department)
Cyclists from Auvergne-Rhône-Alpes